MPEG-2 transport stream may refer to:
 MPEG transport stream, defined in the ISO MPEG-2 standard
 .m2ts, a filename extension used for the BDAV MPEG-2 Transport Stream, defined by Blu-ray Disc Association